Presidential Suite: Eight Variations on Freedom is an album by the Ted Nash Big Band that won the Grammy Award for Best Large Jazz Ensemble Album in 2017. "Spoken at Midnight" won Best Instrumental Composition.

Most of the musicians are members of the Jazz at Lincoln Center Orchestra led by Wynton Marsalis. Nash has been a member since the 1990s and wrote the music on a commission for the orchestra.

Track listing

Personnel 
Adapted from AllMusic.

Musicians
 Ted Nash – conductor, alto sax, soprano sax, arranger
 Walter Blanding – soprano sax, tenor sax, clarinet
 Charles Pillow – clarinet, flute, alto sax, soprano sax
 Paul Nedzela – bass clarinet, baritone sax
 Victor Goines – bass, clarinet, alto flute, tenor sax
 Sherman Irby – flute, alto flute, alto sax
 Greg Gisbert – trumpet
 Ryan Kisor – trumpet
 Wynton Marsalis – trumpet
 Marcus Printup – trumpet
 Kenny Rampton – trumpet
 Chris Crenshaw – trombone
 Vince Gardner – trombone
 Elliot Mason – trombone
 Carlos Henríquez – double bass, bass guitar
 Dan Nimmer – piano
 Ali Jackson – drums, percussion
 Zach Adelman – percussion
 Ansel Scholl – cowbell

Readers
 Douglas Brinkley, Glenn Close, Deepak Chopra, Joe Lieberman, David Miliband, William vanden Heuvel, Sam Waterston, Andrew Young

Production
 Liner notes – Ted Nash, Douglas Brinkley, Kabir Sehgal
 Kabir Sehgal – executive producer
 Jana Herzen – senior producer
 Producer – Robert Allen, Douglas Brinkley, Michael Fricklas, Herschel Garfein, Adam Inselbuch, Scott Jacobson, Alexander Walser
 Assistant producer – Kenya Autie, Oscar Autie, Paul Avgerinos
 Associate producer – Ryan Bethea, Dorie Clark, Laura Dickinson, Jose Garcia, Ben Gundersheimer, Lori Henriques, Ryan Holiday, Saad Khan, David Longoria, Nicolas Rodriguez-Brizuela, Grant Maloy Smith, Dennis Sy, Julian Weller, Camille Zamora
 Rob Macomber – engineer, mixing engineer
 Doug Schwartz – mastering engineer

See also
The Kennedy Dream, a 1967 album by Oliver Nelson of big band compositions interspersed with speeches by John F. Kennedy

References

External links

2016 albums
Big band albums
Grammy Award for Best Large Jazz Ensemble Album
Ted Nash (saxophonist, born 1960) albums